Mark Perrin Lowrey Love Sr. (November 8, 1881 - ?) was a Baptist official and state legislator in Mississippi. He was a Democrat and a Baptist. He married and had six children.

He was born in Brooksville, Mississippi. He attended Mississippi College.

He lived in Hattiesburg. In 1927 he was a candidate for Lieutenant Governor but lost to Bidwell Adam.

References

Democratic Party Mississippi state senators
20th-century American politicians
1881 births
People from Hattiesburg, Mississippi
Baptists from Mississippi
People from Noxubee County, Mississippi
Year of death missing